No Day Without You is a 1933 German comedy film directed by Hans Behrendt and starring Lee Parry, Oskar Karlweis, and Paul Hörbiger. It was shot at the Johannisthal Studios in Berlin.

Cast

References

Bibliography
 Klaus, Ulrich J. Deutsche Tonfilme: Jahrgang 1933. Klaus-Archiv, 1988.

External links

Films of the Weimar Republic
Films directed by Hans Behrendt
German black-and-white films
German comedy films
1933 comedy films
1930s German films
1930s German-language films
Films shot at Johannisthal Studios